= Vehicle registration plates of Oman =

Sultanate of Oman
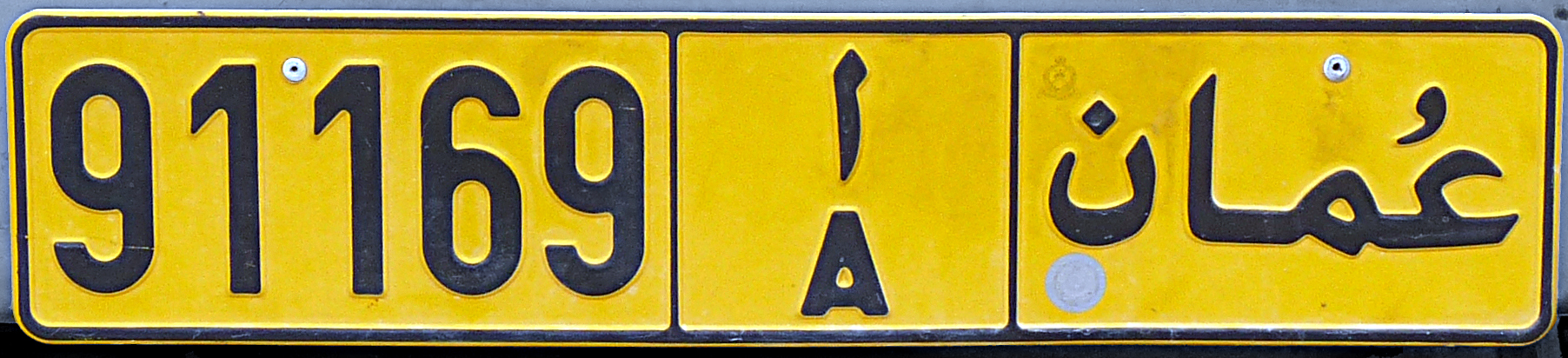
- Registration plate from Oman, (started in 2021).
- Country: Oman
- Country code: OM (some sources state that Oman has no international UN road code attibuted)

Current series
- Slogan: Oman in Arabic
- Size: 520 mm × 110 mm 20.5 in × 4.3 in
- Serial format: 1(234) A(B)
- Colour (front): Black on yellow
- Colour (rear): Black on yellow

Vehicle registration plates of Oman started in 1970. The current version started in 2001.

== Vehicle types (new plates) ==
There are several type of plates in Oman: (Private / Taxi / Commercial / learn driving/ government / political body / Authority Consulate / UN / Tractor / Bicycle mechanism / export / checking / rental)

Vehicle types
Type	Example	Meaning
Private		yellow = private vehicle
Taxi		red = non-private vehicle

== Main district codes (for old plates ) ==
The style is 99999 X(X(X)) with Arabic numbers followed with letters. X is district registered to:

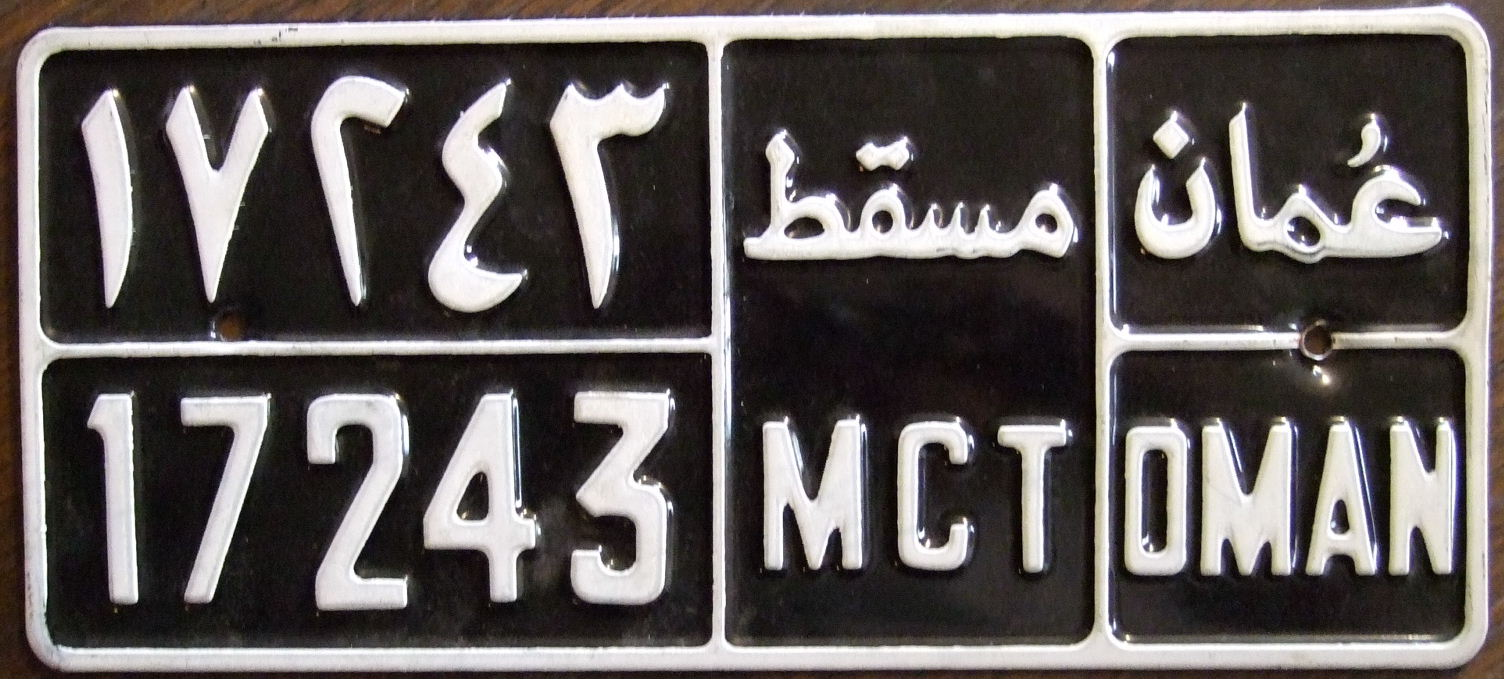
Old Registration plate from Oman

Letter(s)	District
A	Muscat
B	Batinah
DH	Dhahira
J	Junabiah
M	Musandam
MCT	Muscat Capital Town
SH	Sharqiya
